Mark Daniel Stoneman (born 26 June 1987) is an English cricketer who plays for Middlesex County Cricket Club and for England. He made his international debut for England in August 2017. He bats left handed and normally plays as an opening batsman.

Early life and domestic career
Stoneman attended Marley Hill County Primary School, followed by Whickham School. He joined Durham in 2005 and played two seasons in the second eleven, before making his first team debut in 2007.

Stoneman scored fifty in his second match, against Hampshire and what was then his highest score, 101, in a victory over Sussex in September 2007.

On 26 July 2016, Stoneman signed for Surrey ahead of the 2017 season. In July 2018, Stoneman reached the milestone of 10,000 first-class runs.

In 2021, Stoneman signed for Yorkshire on loan to play 5 games in the Vitality Blast.

International career
Stoneman played for England in the 2006 U-19 Cricket World Cup in Sri Lanka. In August 2017, he was named in England's Test squad for their series against the West Indies, to replace Keaton Jennings as opening partner to Alastair Cook. He made his Test debut in the first match of the series on 17 August 2017. He is the first cricketer to make his debut in a Day-Night Test match. He kept his place in the team for the 2017-18 Ashes Series and made his Ashes debut in the opening Test match in Brisbane on 23 November 2017, partnering Cook and made 53 in the first innings before being dismissed by Pat Cummins.

References

External links
 

1987 births
Living people
English cricketers
England Test cricketers
Durham cricketers
Middlesex cricketers 
Surrey cricketers
Yorkshire cricketers
Cricketers from Newcastle upon Tyne